Langbaurgh is a hamlet in the civil parish of Great Ayton in North Yorkshire, England.  The place gave its name to the Langbaurgh Wapentake.

Langbaurgh Hall is a Grade II listed building, dating from 1830.

North of the hamlet is the Langbaurgh Ridge, part of the Cleveland Dyke, where stone was quarried to make setts for road construction.

References 

Villages in North Yorkshire